Park Sun-young (born August 12, 1993), known professionally as Luna, is a South Korean singer, musical actress and television presenter. She debuted as a member of girl group f(x) in September 2009. Apart from her group's activities, Luna has established herself as a musical actress, notably through her participation in the original and Korean versions of stage musicals including Legally Blonde, Coyote Ugly, High School Musical on Stage!, School OZ Hologram Musical, In the Heights, Rebecca, Rudolf (The Last Kiss) and Autant en emporte le vent (Gone with The Wind). She also starred in the film The Lightning Man's Secret (2015).

In 2016, she released her debut extended play Free Somebody, making her the second f(x) member after Amber to debut as a solo artist. In September 2019, Luna left SM Entertainment and joined Humap Contents for her future solo activities. In February 2021, Luna established her own entertainment agency called Grida Entertainment. In 2022, Luna played the starring role in KPOP the musical on Broadway in Manhattan.

Early life 
Luna was born as Park Sun-young in Seoul, South Korea on August 12, 1993, to a family of classical vocal singers. She has an older brother, and an older twin sister named Park Jin-young. Luna is the only member of her family to not major in classical music.

Career

2006–2010: Career beginnings 

In 2006, SM Entertainment recruited Luna after seeing her performing on an SBS television program, Truth Game. She later debuted as the main vocalist and lead dancer of South Korean girl group f(x) in September 2009. Aside from the group's activities, Luna also made several solo appearances. In 2010, she appeared as the regular member of Star King for a long time and earned a Newcomer Award from the SBS Entertainment Awards for her appearance and effort. Later in the year, Luna recorded the song "Let's Go" alongside labelmates Sungmin, Seohyun, and Jonghyun, for the purpose of increasing public participation in the 2010 G-20 Seoul summit. She released a duet with Super Junior's Yesung "And I Love You" for the soundtrack of KBS2 drama The President and a solo single "Beautiful Day" which served as the OST for drama Please Marry Me.

2011–2015: Solo activities

In 2011, Luna was reported to making her musical debut and would take on the character Elle Woods in Legally Blonde. In April, she started hosting music program The Show from MTV Korea along with Secret's Hyoseong. Luna was cast in the TV Chosun drama entitled Saving Mrs. Go Bong-shil as Seo In-young, a college student and youngest daughter of the title character, which was first aired in December 2011. It was her drama debut alongside SS501's Kim Kyu Jong.

In 2012, she appeared on Immortal Songs 2 as a contestant, performing Magma's "I Can't Know." Luna won the first place award for her performance. In the same year, she released a duet with Girls' Generation's Sunny for SBS drama To The Beautiful You soundtrack and solo single "It's Okay" for SBS drama Cheongdam Alice'''s OST. The following year, Luna returned to musical performances by taking on the role of Gabriella Montez for the Korean version of High School Musical on Stage!. She also recorded duets with Super Junior members Ryeowook for the musical, and Kyuhyun for The Croods soundtrack, as well as solo single "U+Me" which was used as the theme song for the game Softmax TalesWeaver.

In 2014, Luna was also chosen to feature on "Dream Drive," the debut single of co-ed project team Play The Siren. In March, she was confirmed to be one of the hosts for MBC Music's new survival b-boy competition program Dance Battle Korea. Luna also starred as Diana in SM Entertainment's first hologram musical School OZ, alongside labelmates Changmin, Key, Suho, Xiumin, and Seulgi.

In March 2015, she was announced to be acting in the web drama entitled Jumping Girl, alongside Block B members U-Kwon and B-Bomb. This would be her first time playing the female lead in an acting project. Subsequently, Luna was also cast as the main female lead in the children's movie Thunderman's Secret. In the same year, she participated on MBC's King of Masked Singer and received widespread praise for her performance. Luna released the digital single "Don't Cry For Me", a remake of Lee Eun Ha's hit song from 1986, on May 10, to thank her fans and viewers of King of Masked Singer for supporting her during her run in the program. She also took part in the Anh Chi Hwan special for Immortal Song 2, and showcased her powerful singing ability with her cover of the classic hit "Salt Doll". It was announced in July, 2015, that Luna would star as Nina Rosario in the Korean production of the Broadway musical In The Heights, which began in September of that year and came to a close in November. At the end of the year, she collaborated with Ailee, Apink's Eun-ji & Mamamoo's Solar at the 2015 SBS Gayo Daejun to perform a cover of Jinju's "I'm Okay" for the Limited Edition I - Diva Together section of the show, on December 27.

 2016–2019: Solo debut and musical theatre activities
In April, 2016, Luna was appointed as a fixed presenter of OnStyle TV's "Get it Beauty" program. On May 6, 2016, she released a collaborative single with Amber, R3hab, and Xavi&Gi, "Wave", as part of the SM Station project. On May 17, 2016, it was rumoured that Luna would debut as a solo artist with a mini album in mid June, which was confirmed on May 26. On May 31, 2016, she made her solo debut with the mini album, Free Somebody, complete with 6 songs, including a title track of the same name. Throughout August, 2016, Luna reprised her role as Nina in the Tokyo shows of In The Heights. Also that month, she started her own YouTube channel, Luna's Alphabet, on which she uploads vlogs twice a week. On October 2, Luna released another collaborative single with Amber, and featuring Ferry Corsten and Kago Pengchi, as part of SM Station, titled "Heartbeat". On December 16, she collaborated with Shin Yong-jae to release "It's You", also as part of the SM Station project. On December 30, Luna collaborated with Yesung, Sunny, Red Velvet's Seulgi and Wendy, NCT's Taeil and Doyoung, and Lee Dong-woo, on "Sound of Your Heart", SM Station's final song of 2016.In January 2017, it was confirmed that Luna was cast to star in food variety show Strong Girls, alongside Park Bo-ram, Fiestar's Cao Lu, Young-ji, and Giant Pink. The show's first episode aired on E Channel on January 23. On January 12, a collaborative song between Luna, Beast's Junhyung, and Jeong Hyeong-don, titled "Tell Me It's Okay" was released, produced through the show Hitmaker. Also on January 12, it was announced that Luna, EXID's Hani, and Mamamoo's Solar would release a collaborative dance song on January 19, produced by Park Geun-tae. It was later revealed that the song's title is "Honey Bee", and is of the pop soul genre, incorporating 808 bass and saxophone. On January 28, she performed "Father" on Immortal Songs 2 as part of the show's 'Lunar New Year Family Special', with her sister, Jin-young, winning first place.

On May 30, 2017, it was announced that Luna would be starring in the 2017 South Korean musical production of Rebecca, alongside Shin Young-sook, Jung Young-ju, Kim Sun-young, and Lee Sang-hyun, with performances expected to begin in August. On July 15, she released an OST for the drama Good Thief, Bad Thief, titled "Where Are You". On August 15, Luna also released an OST for the drama The King in Love, titled "Could You Tell Me". On October 16, 2017, it was announced that she would be in the musical "The Last Kiss", also titled Rudolf in other countries, Luna will play the role of Rudolf's lover Mary Vetsera. On November 17, she collaborated on a global version of the main track "This Is Me", from the movie The Greatest Showman, along with singers and influencers from 18 countries.
Luna released a solo version of the song YouTube.

On January 5, 2018, she released a collaborative single with Amber, "Lower", as part of SM Station project. On February 9, 2018, Luna collaborated with Heda, a winner of "everysing" app, as part of SM Station project, to re-release a duet version of "Free Somebody". On February 20, 2018, she released an OST for the drama Should We Kiss First?, titled "Is It Love?". In April, 2018, it was announced that Luna would release her next solo release this month, marked it as her comeback after 2 years with her debut mini album, Free Somebody. On April 24, Luna released her new single, "Night Reminiscin'", featuring Yang Da-il, included with a B-side track, "Falling Out". In January 2019, Luna released a new single called "Even So", including 2 B-side tracks, "안녕 이대로 안녕 (Bye Bye)", and "Do You Love Me" featuring Korean-American singer Johan Kim.

2019–present: Departure from SM Entertainment
On September 5, 2019, SM Entertainment announced that Luna had not renewed her contract with the company. In October 2019, she signed with Humap Contents.

In 2020, Luna lent her voice in single "Flow" for an original character named Luna Snow in NetEase and Marvel Entertainment's mobile game Marvel Super War.

On February 24, 2021, it was confirmed that Luna established her own entertainment agency, Grida Entertainment.

On September 24, 2021, it was confirmed that Luna plans to release digital single in early October. Luna officially release new single titled "Madonna" on October 6.

In 2022, Luna portrayed the lead role of MwE in the Broadway musical KPOP.

Philanthropy

In February 2017, Luna revealed an underwear collection that she designed in collaboration with C'esttout called Girls Can Do Anything, where proceeds would be donated to the Korean Unwed Mothers' Families Association, an organisation that assists single mothers and their families in South Korea. She also donated over 14,000 sanitary pads to the association, for those unable to afford them.

Personal life
In October 2011, it was confirmed that Luna had been accepted at Chung-Ang University's Institute of the Arts as a theater major through a special rolling admissions screening process.

Discography

Extended plays
 Free Somebody'' (2016)

Filmography

Film

Television drama

Variety shows

Video games

Musical theatre

Awards and nominations

See also
 Korean culture in New York City
 Koreans in New York City

References

External links

 

1993 births
Living people
South Korean twins
F(x) (group) members
Singers from Seoul
South Korean women pop singers
Japanese-language singers of South Korea
Mandarin-language singers of South Korea
South Korean female idols
South Korean television presenters
South Korean women television presenters
South Korean musical theatre actresses
South Korean television actresses
South Korean film actresses
SM Entertainment artists
21st-century South Korean women singers
21st-century South Korean actresses